Marion is a city in and the county seat of Crittenden County, Arkansas, United States. The population was 12,345 at the 2010 census, a 38.7% increase since 2000. The city is part of the Memphis metropolitan area. It is the second largest city in Crittenden County, behind West Memphis.

History
Although Marion was incorporated in 1896, the community predates that significantly. The site of Marion was part of Louisiana (New Spain) from 1764 to 1803, when it became Louisiana (New France). Some of the oldest land titles in the area are from Spanish land grants from a time prior to the Louisiana Purchase. After the Louisiana Purchase the area was part of the Arkansas Territory. During the 1830s the Trail of Tears, the forced removal of Native Americans from Georgia, Alabama, and Mississippi, passed through the area.
Its location is close to where the Sultana Steamboat exploded and sunk. A memorial is placed on the city hall square to remember those who were lost in the accident.

Marion, Arkansas was named after Marion Tolbert. In 1837, two commissioners had been appointed by the county court to select a site for a new county seat. Tolbert and his wife, Temperance, gave a deed to the commissioners "for the county of Crittenden for county purposes" on June 25, 1837. A town was laid out and named Marion in honor of Marion Tolbert.  The town of Marion  was officially made the county seat of Crittenden County, Arkansas. Marion has been incorporated on multiple occasions, first in 1851. The current incorporation dates from 1896.

During the American Civil War the steamboat Sultana was destroyed in an explosion on April 27, 1865, as it was transporting released Union POWs near Mound City, just east of Marion. It is estimated that 1,500 soldiers and crew were killed, the largest loss of life in a maritime accident in US history. This tragedy is commemorated by a historic marker placed by the Daughters of the American Revolution.

In 1954, a local Black man, Isadore Banks was murdered by a mob in the town. He was chained to a tree, covered with gasoline and burned. Nobody was ever charged in the killing.

Geography

Marion is located in eastern Crittenden County at  (35.206092, -90.201734). It is bordered by the city of West Memphis to the south and by Sunset and Clarkedale to the north.

Ecologically, Marion is located on the border between the Northern Backswamps (west Marion) and Northern Holocene Meander Belts (east Marion) ecoregions within the larger Mississippi Alluvial Plain. The Northern Backswamps are a network of low-lying overflow areas and floodplains historically dominated by bald cypress, water tupelo, overcup oak, water hickory, and Nuttall oak forest subject to year-round or seasonal inundation. The Northern Holocene Meander Belts are the flat floodplains and former alignments of the Mississippi River, including levees, oxbow lakes, and point bars. Much of the wetlands and  riverine habitat have been drained and developed for agricultural or urban land uses. The Wapanocca National Wildlife Refuge, which preserves some of the year-round flooded bald cypress forest typical of this ecoregion prior to development for row agriculture lies north of Marion.

Transportation

Major highways
Marion is bisected by Interstate 55/US 61 and is located just to the north of its junction with Interstate 40 prior to their crossing the Mississippi River, en route to Memphis. U.S. Highway 64 is the major east-west route through the town. Arkansas Highway 77 is a major north-south arterial road, east of Interstate 55, and Highway 118 is the major north-south arterial road, west of Interstate 55.

Aviation
Marion is served for general aviation by the West Memphis Municipal Airport (KAWM). General DeWitt Spain Airport is a civil aviation airport just north of downtown Memphis. Memphis International Airport is located south of Memphis; it provides commercial aviation through numerous carriers and is the international cargo hub for FedEx.

Rail
Union Pacific operates a  intermodal facility west of Marion. BNSF Railway also operates an intermodal yard in Marion.

Limited passenger rail is available on Amtrak at Central Station in nearby Memphis. The City of New Orleans runs twice daily on a north-south route from Chicago to New Orleans.

Water
Crittenden County and West Memphis jointly operate a port on the Mississippi River. The International Port of Memphis lies just across the Mississippi River via Interstate 55. The International Port of Memphis is the fourth-largest inland port in the United States.

Community
Because of its proximity to Memphis and Interstate highways, Marion offers the activities and enrichment of a large city while maintaining the character of a small community. In addition to the many community events common to any town, each May Marion hosts the Esperanza Bonanza, a festival that includes live music, a barbecue competition, a rodeo, a golf tournament, a carnival, and games for adults & children. More recently Marion has begun "Christmas on the Square" in early December co-sponsored by the local Kiwanis Club and the Marion Chamber of Commerce.

Marion is served by the Woolfolk Public Library which is jointly operated by Crittenden County and the city of Marion. It was named in honor of a local author and newspaper editor, Margaret Woolfolk.

Outdoor recreation is a big part of community life, from organized youth sports to individual and family activities. Marion is located less than 1 hour from 12 Arkansas, Tennessee or Mississippi state parks. The nearby community of Horseshoe Lake offers opportunity for water sports.

Healthcare
Marion and Crittenden County were served by Crittenden Regional Hospital a 152-bed JCAHO Accredited facility  in nearby West Memphis until its closure in 2014. Starting in 2016 Crittenden Regional Hospital was converted into a female correctional facility and renamed East Central Arkansas Community Correction Center.

Marion and Crittenden County have been served by Baptist Memorial Hospital-Crittenden which opened on December 13, 2018.

Demographics

2020 census

As of the 2020 United States Census, there were 13,752 people, 4,543 households, and 3,198 families residing in the city.

2010 Census 

As of the census of 2010, there were 12,345 people and 4,278 households in the city. The racial makeup of the city was 68.1% White, 28% Black or African American, 0.4% Native American, 1.5% Asian, 1.4% from two or more races.  2.0% of the population were Hispanic or Latino of any race.

88% of the population had a high school diploma and 28% reported a bachelor's degree or higher. 2.5% of the population is foreign born and 4.4% report a language other than English being spoken at home. The home ownership rate was 71.3% at a median value of $142,200. The median household income was $60,051. 7.3% of the population are below the poverty line.

Education
Crittenden County is served by Mid-South Community College in West Memphis. The college offers bachelor's and master's degree programs in conjunction with Arkansas State University, the University of Arkansas, the University of Central Arkansas, Arkansas Tech University and Franklin University.

Public schools
The Marion School District serves most of the city while a small portion is zoned to the West Memphis School District.

Marion district schools:
Visual and Performing Arts Magnet School (grades pre-k through 6th grade) (West Memphis)
Math, Science, and Technology Magnet School  (grades K through 6th)
Herbert Carter Global Magnet School (grades K through 6th)
Marion Middle School  (grade 7)
Marion Jr. High School (grades 8 through 9)
Marion High School (grades 10-12)

The sole high school of the West Memphis district is Academies of West Memphis (formerly West Memphis High School).

Private schools
West Memphis Christian School, PK-12 (West Memphis)
Crittenden Pentecostal Academy, K-12 (West Memphis)
St. Michael's Catholic School, PK-6 (West Memphis)

Notes

References

External links

City of Marion official website
Marion Chamber of Commerce
"Marion" entry, Arkansas Encyclopedia of History and Culture

 
Cities in Crittenden County, Arkansas
Cities in the Memphis metropolitan area
County seats in Arkansas
U.S. Route 64
Interstate 55
Cities in Arkansas
1896 establishments in Arkansas
Populated places established in 1896